"Don't Make Me Wait For Love" is a song by Kenny G featuring Lenny Williams on lead vocals—the first single released from Kenny G's 1986 album Duotones. The song was written and composed by Walter Afanasieff, Preston Glass and Narada Michael Walden.

In the US, "Don't Make Me Wait For Love" was first released in late 1986 where it only peaked at number 77 on the Hot Black Singles chart.  Later in 1987 the song's re-issue went on to reach number 17 on the Hot Black Singles chart and number 15 on the Hot 100 chart.  "Don't Make Me Wait For Love" had its best showing on the Adult Contemporary music charts, where it peaked at number 2.

Credits and personnel
 Kenny G: tenor saxophone
 Lenny Williams: lead and background vocals
 Walter Afanasieff: songwriter, keyboards, synthesizers
 Preston Glass: songwriter, producer, synthesizers, drum programming, background vocals
 Narada Michael Walden: songwriter, executive producer, additional arrangements
 Randy Jackson: Moog Source synth bass
 Claytoven Richardson, Karen "Kitty Beethoven" Brewington, Gina Glass, Yolanda Glass – background vocals

Chart positions

Live Recordings
Michael Bolton was the guest lead vocalist for the live version of the song in Kenny's 1989 Kenny G Live recording.

References

1986 songs
Kenny G songs
1987 singles
Songs written by Preston Glass
Songs written by Walter Afanasieff
Songs written by Narada Michael Walden
Arista Records singles